Jean-Baptiste Pierazzi (born 17 June 1985) is a French footballer who plays as a defensive midfielder for Olympias Lympion.

Club career
Jean-Baptiste began his professional career with AC Ajaccio during the 2006–07 season, making his debut under coach Ruud Krol. He made 25 appearances in his debut season in Ligue 2, and was also an important player during Gernot Rohr's tenure at the club. He also captained the club during the 2010–11 season in which he helped Ajaccio gain promotion to Ligue 1. In his first season in the top flight, Pierazzi appeared in 34 league matches and helped the club maintain its Ligue 1 status. During his time with Ajaccio, Pierazzi appeared in 112 Ligue 2 matches and 67 Ligue 1 matches.

During January 2014, Pierazzi signed with Major League Soccer side San Jose Earthquakes.

References

External links

1985 births
Living people
Sportspeople from Ajaccio
French footballers
Association football midfielders
French expatriate footballers
AC Ajaccio players
San Jose Earthquakes players
Paris FC players
Alki Oroklini players
Gazélec Ajaccio players
Ligue 1 players
Ligue 2 players
Major League Soccer players
Cypriot First Division players
Expatriate soccer players in the United States
Expatriate footballers in Cyprus
French expatriate sportspeople in Cyprus
French expatriate sportspeople in the United States
Corsica international footballers
Footballers from Corsica